Jean Bernard Tarbé de Vauxclairs (23 February 1767, Sens - 17 September 1842, Paris) was a French engineer. He was made a Commander of the Légion d'honneur.

In August 1792, he was arrested with Antoine Barnave, Bertrand, Alexandre-Théodore-Victor, comte de Lameth, Louis Lebègue Duportail, and Marguerite-Louis-François Duport-Dutertre.

Works
 Dictionary of public works, military and maritime, considered in dealing with legislation, administration and jurisprudence (Paris, Carillian Goeury, 1835).

References

1767 births
1842 deaths
French civil engineers
Commandeurs of the Légion d'honneur
People from Sens
French marine engineers